Kalva (also, Kel’va, Kyal’ve, and Kyalva) is a village and municipality in the Agsu Rayon of Azerbaijan.  It has a population of 1,772.

References 

Populated places in Agsu District